Rachel Elizabeth Kyte  is a British academic serving as the Dean of The Fletcher School at Tufts University, and the first woman to lead the oldest graduate-only school of international affairs in the United States. She was the former Chief Executive Officer of Sustainable Energy for All, and Special Representative of the United Nations Secretary-General for Sustainable Energy for All.

Education 
Kyte was raised in Eastern England. She earned a Bachelor of Arts degree in history and politics from the University of London and a master's degree in international relations from the Fletcher School.

Career 
Kyte has focused on affordable, reliable, and sustainable energy as the key to combating both poverty and climate change. From 2016 to 2019, Kyte managed SEforALL's work to mobilize action towards its 2030 goals of ensuring universal access to modern energy services; doubling the global rate of improvement in energy efficiency; and doubling the share of renewable energy in the global energy mix. As Special Representative for the Secretary-General, she was also the point person in the United Nations for action towards the Sustainable Development Goal 7 on sustainable energy.

Kyte served until December 2015 as World Bank Group Vice President and Special Envoy for Climate Change, leading the Bank Group's efforts to campaign for an ambitious agreement at the 21st Convention of the Parties of the UNFCCC (COP 21). She was previously World Bank Vice President for Sustainable Development and was the International Finance Corporation Vice President for Business Advisory Services.

Recipient of numerous awards for women's leadership, climate action, and sustainable development, she is a professor of practice in sustainable development at the Fletcher School of Law and Diplomacy at Tufts University. On April 8, 2019, it was announced that Kyte would become the next Dean of the Fletcher School, effective October 1, 2019.

She was appointed Companion of the Order of St Michael and St George (CMG) in the 2020 New Year Honours for services to energy and combating climate change.

Kyte joined the advisory board of General Atlantic's climate change fund, BeyondNetZero, in July 2021.

See also

Sustainable Development
Sustainable Development Goals
Sustainable Energy for All
Fletcher School of Law and Diplomacy
United Nations
University of London
World Bank Group

References

External links
Sustainable Energy for All (SEforALL)
Twitter

Living people
World Bank people
United Nations officials
Companions of the Order of St Michael and St George
Tufts University faculty
Alumni of the University of London
British emigrants to the United States
1965 births